Eduardo Novoa (born 4 May 1950) is a Chilean judoka. He competed in the men's middleweight event at the 1984 Summer Olympics.

References

External links
 

1950 births
Living people
Chilean male judoka
Olympic judoka of Chile
Judoka at the 1984 Summer Olympics
Place of birth missing (living people)
Pan American Games medalists in judo
Pan American Games bronze medalists for Chile
Judoka at the 1979 Pan American Games
Medalists at the 1979 Pan American Games
20th-century Chilean people
21st-century Chilean people